The 1964–65 Nationalliga A season was the 27th season of the Nationalliga A, the top level of ice hockey in Switzerland. 10 teams participated in the league, and SC Bern won the championship.

Standings

External links
 Championnat de Suisse 1964/65

National League (ice hockey) seasons
Swiss
1964–65 in Swiss ice hockey